The enzyme glucuronan lyase catalyzes the following process:

Eliminative cleavage of (1→4)-β-D-glucuronans to give oligosaccharides with 4-deoxy-β-D-gluc-4-enuronosyl groups at their non-reducing ends. Complete degradation of glucuronans results in the formation of tetrasaccharides.

This enzyme belongs to the family of lyases, specifically those carbon-oxygen lyases acting on polysaccharides.  The systematic name of this enzyme class is (1→4)-β-D-glucuronan lyase. This enzyme is also called (1,4)-β-D-glucuronan lyase.

References

 

EC 4.2.2
Enzymes of unknown structure